Walter Wreszinski (March 18, 1880, in Mogilno (now Poland) – 9 April 1935) was a German Egyptologist and professor at Albertus University of Königsberg.

Education
He studied in Leipzig from 1898 to 1899, then in Berlin from 1899 to 1904 (under Adolf Erman). During this period he worked on the Dictionary of the Egyptian language.

In Berlin, he graduated in 1904 with a dissertation on The High Priest of Amon.

Following his graduation, he moved to Königsberg in 1909, initially as a lecturer, then from 1920 as honorary associate professor, and from 1927 as associate professor.

From 1921 to 1931 Wreszinski was editor of the Orientalist literature journal.

In 1934, after the Law for the Restoration of Civil Service was passed by the Nazi Party led government, Wreszinski lost his professorship by reason of his Jewish ancestry.

Works
The five-volume Atlas of Ancient Egyptian culture history is considered his masterpiece.
The high priest of Amon, Diss, Berlin 1904.
Egyptian inscriptions from the K.K. Court Museum in Vienna, Leipzig 1906.
The medicine of the ancient Egyptians I. The large medical papyrus in the Berlin Museum (Berl Pap. 3038). In facsimile and transcription with translation, commentary and glossary, Leipzig 1909.
The medicine of the ancient Egyptians II The London Medical Papyrus (BM 10059) and the Papyrus Hearst. Transcription, translation and commentary, Leipzig 1912.
The medicine of the ancient Egyptians III. The Papyrus Ebers. Transcription, translation and commentary, Leipzig 1913th
Lepsius: Monuments of Egypt and Ethiopia, Volume V, 1913.
Atlas of ancient Egyptian cultural history, 5 vols, Leipzig 1913–1936.
Report on the photographic expedition from Cairo to Wadi Halfa. Order to prepare and collect material for my Atlas of ancient Egyptian history, culture, Leipzig 1927

Literature
Bierbrier, ML, Warren R. Dawson, Eric P. Uphill, Who's Who in Egyptology, London 1995, p. 452-453.

External links
 

1880 births
1935 deaths
20th-century German writers
German Egyptologists
German lexicographers
Jewish orientalists
Academic staff of the University of Königsberg
Leipzig University alumni
Humboldt University of Berlin alumni
19th-century German Jews
People from Mogilno
People from the Province of Posen
German male non-fiction writers
20th-century lexicographers